West Sale Airport  is located about  west of Sale, Victoria, Australia, off the Princes Highway.

History

World War II
During World War II, the aerodrome was requisitioned by the Royal Australian Air Force in 1941. Known as RAAF Base West Sale and RAAF Station West Sale, the aerodrome was home to No. 3 Bombing and Gunnery School and Air Gunnery School until December 1945, when the aerodrome was handed back to its owners.

Postwar
From 1991 to 2016 there were 11 Grumman S-2 Tracker anti-submarine aircraft formerly of the Royal Australian Navy stored at the airport.

The Gippsland Armed Forces Museum is located at West Sale Airport.

See also
 List of airports in Victoria

References

Airports in Victoria (Australia)
Sale, Victoria